Wasting My Time may refer to:

"Wasting My Time" (Default song), 2001
"Wasting My Time", a 1981 song by Klaus Nomi from Klaus Nomi
"Wasting My Time", a 2000 song by the Spice Girls from Forever
"Wasting My Time", a 1993 song by Take That from Everything Changes
"Wasting My Time", a 1999 song by The White Stripes from The White Stripes

See also
Wasting Time (disambiguation)